Chaetostoma trimaculineum is a species of catfish in the family Loricariidae. It is native to South America, where it occurs in the drainage basins of the Santiago River and the Marañón River in Ecuador and Peru. The species reaches 16 cm (6.3 inches) SL. 

This species was described in 2015 by Nathan K. Lujan of the American Museum of Natural History, Vanessa Meza-Vargas of the Pontifical Catholic University of Rio Grande do Sul, Viviana Astudillo-Clavijo, Ramiro Barriga of the Central University of Venezuela, and Hernán López-Fernández of the University of Michigan.

References 

Fish described in 2015
trimaculineum
Catfish of South America
Fish of Ecuador
Fish of Peru